"Hug" is the debut single by South Korean pop group TVXQ. Written by Yoon Jung and Park Chang-hyun and produced by Park Chang-hyun, "Hug" was first performed at a joint showcase featuring label mate BoA and American singer Britney Spears on December 26, 2003, TVXQ's official debut day. The song was later released as a CD maxi single on January 14, 2004, in South Korea. Its accompanying music video was filmed in December 2003 at the Ilsan Art House. The follow-up promotional song, "My Little Princess", was written by Hwang Sung-jae.

Under the name Tohoshinki, the group released an English version of "Hug" as a CD and DVD single in Japan on November 25, 2004. The Japanese language version of "Hug" was featured in the group's debut Japanese album Heart, Mind and Soul (2006). The Mandarin-language counterpart of "Hug" was released in May 2007.

Commercial performance 
"Hug" was a sleeper hit in South Korea. It debuted at number thirty seven on the MIAK chart, selling only 4,630 copies in the first month of release. Sales picked up the following month, and on March 28, 2004, TVXQ won their first music show award with "Hug" on The Music Trend. According to the MIAK, "Hug" peaked at number four on the months of April and May, selling a total of 56,543 copies in those months. "Hug" stayed charted for ten consecutive months, and by the end of the year, "Hug" sold over 169,000 copies. It was South Korea's fourteenth best-selling record of 2004.

Accolades
In 2021, the song was included in Melon and Seoul Shinmun's critics ranking of Top 100 K-pop Songs of All Time at number 98.

Formats and track listings
Korean single
"Hug"
"My Little Princess (...)" (...; lit. "I Know...")
"Oh holy night" 
"My Little Princess" 
"Hug" 
"Hug" 

Japanese single
Disc 1 
"HUG" 
"HUG" 
"HUG" 

Disc 2 
"HUG" 
"HUG" 
"The way U are"

Chart performance
In South Korea, "Hug" sold 242,890 copies as of 2014. In Japan, "Hug" sold 4,710 copies.

Weekly charts

Monthly charts

Year-end charts

Footnotes

References

External links

TVXQ songs
2004 songs
2004 singles
Korean-language songs
Japanese-language songs
SM Entertainment singles